Tectonatica impervia is a species of predatory sea snail, a marine gastropod mollusc in the family Naticidae, the moon snails.

Description 
The maximum recorded shell length is 18.1 mm.

Distribution
This marine species occurs off Chile.

Habitat 
Minimum recorded depth is 5 m. Maximum recorded depth is 460 m.

References

 Torigoe K. & Inaba A. (2011) Revision on the classification of Recent Naticidae. Bulletin of the Nishinomiya Shell Museum 7: 133 + 15 pp., 4 pls.
 Engl, W. (2012). Shells of Antarctica. Hackenheim: Conchbooks. 402 pp

External links
 Philippi, [R. A. (1845). Diagnosen einiger neuen Conchylien. Archiv für Naturgeschichte. 11: 50-71.]
 Rochebrune A.T. de & Mabille J. (1885). Diagnoses de mollusques nouveaux, recueillis par les membres de la mission du Cap Horn et M. Lebrun, Préparateur au Muséum, chargé d'une mission à Santa-Cruz de Patagonie. Bulletin de la Société Philomathique de Paris. (7) 9(3): 100-111
  Griffiths, H.J.; Linse, K.; Crame, J.A. (2003). SOMBASE - Southern Ocean mollusc database: a tool for biogeographic analysis in diversity and evolution. Organisms Diversity and Evolution. 3: 207-213
 Di Luca, J. & Zelaya, D. G. (2019). Gastropods from the Burdwood Bank (southwestern Atlantic): an overview of species diversity. Zootaxa. 4544(1): 41-78

Naticidae
Gastropods described in 1845